Poarta Albă (literally in ) is a commune in Constanța County, Northern Dobruja, Romania. The commune is a port on the Danube–Black Sea Canal.

Villages
The following villages are included in the Poarta Albă commune:
 Poarta Albă (historical name: Alakap)
 Nazarcea (historical name: Galeșu between 1930 and 1964)

History

In the early 1950s, a prison camp operated at Poarta Albă, part of a chain of forced labour camps set up along the length of the Canal by the communist authorities. Some 12,000 prisoners were held at the Poarta Albă camp. Many perished due to the harsh working conditions. According to a study done by the International Centre for Studies into Communism, 12.7% of all political prisoners in Communist Romania did some time at Poarta Albă.

Among the political prisoners who did time at the Poarta Albă labor camp were Alexandru Claudian, Vladimir Constantinescu, Gherman Pântea, and Ovidiu Papadima.

Demographics
At the 2011 census, Poarta Albă had a population of 5,208, of which 4,792 were ethnic Romanians (96.69%), 4  Hungarians (0.08%), 35 Roma (0.71%), 53 Turks (1.07%), 55 Tatars (1.11%), 5 Lipovans (0.10%), 5 others (0.10%), and 7 with undeclared ethnicity (0.14%).

Transportation
The Poarta Albă train station serves the CFR Line 800, which connects Bucharest to Constanța and Mangalia on the Black Sea coast.

Natives
 Murat Iusuf

References

External links
 Sub semnul gulagului, by Aurel Popa.

Communes in Constanța County
Localities in Northern Dobruja